Raymond Francis "Buster" Reutt (March 4, 1917 – August 18, 2004) was a professional football player for one season, 1943, in the National Football League. He was a member of the "Steagles", a team that was the result of a temporary merger between the Philadelphia Eagles and Pittsburgh Steelers due to the league-wide manning shortages in 1943 brought on by World War II. He was also an alumnus of the Virginia Military Institute.

References

1917 births
2004 deaths
Steagles players and personnel
VMI Keydets football players
Players of American football from Virginia
Philadelphia Eagles players